Noel Turner may refer to:

 Noel Turner (cricketer) (1887–1941), English first-class cricketer
 Noel Turner (footballer) (born 1974), Maltese former footballer